Forbes Holden Norris Jr. (May 1, 1928 – June 18, 1993) was an American competition swimmer who represented the United States at the 1948 Summer Olympics in London.  Norris competed in the men's 1,500-meter freestyle, and finished sixth in the event final with a time of 20:18.8.

See also
 List of Harvard University people

References

1928 births
1993 deaths
American male freestyle swimmers
Harvard Crimson men's swimmers
Olympic swimmers of the United States
Sportspeople from Richmond, Virginia
Swimmers at the 1948 Summer Olympics